Mati-ur-Rehman (born 17 September 1984)) is a weightlifter from Pakistan.

Career

2010
Rehman won a silver medal at the 2010 South Asian Games held in Dhaka, Bangladesh.

He participated in the 2010 Commonwealth Games in New Delhi, India where he placed 5th in the 69 kg category.

Major competitions

References

Living people
Pakistani male weightlifters
Weightlifters at the 2010 Commonwealth Games
Weightlifters at the 2010 Asian Games
Asian Games competitors for Pakistan
Commonwealth Games competitors for Pakistan
1984 births
South Asian Games silver medalists for Pakistan
South Asian Games medalists in weightlifting